McKillop is an English language surname derived from the Gaelic MacFhilib, meaning "son of Filib" (a Gaelic form of Philip).

There were families of MacKillops on the Isle of Arran; there were also families in Argyll who were a sept of the MacDonalds of Glencoe; others in Inverness-shire were a sept of the McDonnells of Keppoch. MacKillops were also standard-bearers to the Campbells of Dunstaffnage, in Argyll. The MacKillops of Berneray, North Uist are known in Scottish Gaelic as MacPhàic; they were associated with the MacLeods.

The McKillops migrated to the northern Glens of Antrim during the Plantation of Ulster in the early 17th century.  The surname is common around Loughguile, Cushendall and Ballycastle.

List of persons with the surname McKillop
A. B. McKillop (born 1946), Chancellor's Professor and Chair of the history department of Carleton University in Ottawa
Bob McKillop (born 1950), head coach of the men's basketball team at Davidson College
Don McKillop (1928–2005), English actor
Heather McKillop (born 1953), Canadian-American archaeologist
Hugh Cummings McKillop (1872–1937), Canadian politician
Lee Mack (real name: Lee Gordon McKillop) (born 1969), English stand-up comedian
Michael McKillop (born 1990), Irish athlete
Patricia McKillop (born 1956), former field hockey player from Zimbabwe
Rob McKillop, bassist who once played for the thrash metal band Exodus
Scott McKillop (born 1986), American football linebacker for the San Francisco 49ers
Tom McKillop (born 1943), CEO
Tom McKillop (footballer) (1917–1984), Scottish footballer
William McKillop (1860–1909), Irish nationalist

List of persons with the surname MacKillop or Mackillop
Douglas Mackillop (1891–1959), British diplomat
Mary MacKillop (1842–1909), Australian saint of the Catholic Church
Rob MacKillop (born 1959), Scottish musician

References

Anglicised Scottish Gaelic-language surnames
Patronymic surnames
Surnames from given names